Sir Louis-Amable Jetté,  (15 January 1836 – 5 May 1920) was a Canadian lawyer, politician, judge, and professor who served as lieutenant governor of Quebec and chief justice of the Court of King's Bench.

Biography 
He was born in L'Assomption, Lower Canada (now Quebec) in 1836. After receiving a classical education at the Collège de L’Assomption, he studied law at the Collège Sainte-Marie, before being called to the bar in 1857. He then practiced law in Montreal, notably participating in the Guibord case.

A Liberal, he was elected to the House of Commons of Canada representing the riding of Montreal East in 1872, defeating Sir George-Étienne Cartier. He was re-elected in 1874. In 1878, he left politics and became a judge of the Superior Court of Quebec; the same year, he joined the law faculty of the newly-established Université Laval in Montreal (later the Université de Montréal).

From 1898 to 1908 he was the lieutenant governor of Quebec. He was knighted as a Knight Commander of the Order of St Michael and St George (KCMG) during the visit to Quebec of the Duke and Duchess of Cornwall and York (later King George V and Queen Mary) in October 1901. He served as lieutenant governor until 1908, when he returned to the Superior Court bench, becoming chief justice of the Court of King's Bench in 1909. He retired from judicial service in 1911.

He was entombed at the Notre Dame des Neiges Cemetery in Montreal.

Family

His wife, Lady Jette, was the daughter of Rodolphe Laflamme. She was born in Montreal, Quebec March 27, 1841. The couple married, in 1862 and lived at `Spencerwood` Quebec. She volunteered with various benevolent and religious institutions connected with the Church of Rome in Canada. She wrote a biography of Saint Marie-Marguerite d'Youville who founded the religious order the Order of Sisters of Charity of Montreal.

Electoral record

Legacy
Mount Jetté in British Columbia, just inside the junction of the BC, Alaska and Yukon borders at the province's extreme northwest, is named for him. Jetté was a member of the Canadian Boundary Tribunal leading to the resolution of the Alaska Boundary Dispute.

References

 
 

1836 births
1920 deaths
Canadian Knights Commander of the Order of St Michael and St George
Liberal Party of Canada MPs
Lieutenant Governors of Quebec
Members of the House of Commons of Canada from Quebec
Persons of National Historic Significance (Canada)
Judges in Quebec
People from Lanaudière
Burials at Notre Dame des Neiges Cemetery